Korientzé is a village and seat of the commune of Korombana in the Cercle of Mopti in the Mopti Region of southern-central Mali.

References

Populated places in Mopti Region